Widener University Delaware Law School (Delaware Law School and formerly Widener University School of Law) is a private law school in Wilmington, Delaware. It is one of two separate ABA-accredited law schools of Widener University. Widener University Law School was founded in 1971 as the Delaware Law School and became affiliated with Widener in 1975. In 1989, it was known as Widener University School of Law when it was combined with the campus in Harrisburg, Pennsylvania. In 2015, the two campuses separated, with the Harrisburg one renamed to Widener University Commonwealth Law School.

History
Founded in 1971 as The Delaware Law School, the institution became affiliated with then Widener College, later Widener University in 1975 and graduated its first class of 267 in August of that year. The school's name was officially changed to Widener University School of Law in 1989 when the Harrisburg campus was added. With an enrollment of more than 1,100 students, Widener Law grew to become one of the largest Pennsylvania-area law schools. On July 1, 2015, the two campuses were separated into two distinct law schools that operate independently of each other, but remain part of the university. Each law school has its own dean, faculty, students, and curriculum.

Campus
Located in Wilmington, Delaware Law School's 40-acre campus is home to 817 students.

Academics

Widener's legal education program included legal clinics that specialize in environmental law, criminal defense, and civil law, which includes family law, and legal assistance on veteran benefits cases. Another opportunity provided to its students is the Taishoff Advocacy, Technology and Public Service Institute, which offers an eight-day training program that teaches students how to conduct themselves properly in a courtroom trial.

In addition to legal clinics and the Taishoff Advocacy, Technology and Public Service Institute, Widener offers certification in specialized fields of study. At the Delaware campus it offers special certification from the Health Law Institute, the Institute of Delaware Corporate and Business Law, and the Taishoff Advocacy, Technology and Public Service Institute. At the Harrisburg campus special certification is available through the Law and Government Institute.

Both campuses offer a variety of pro-bono work or community outreach opportunities through the Public Interest Initiative on the Harrisburg campus or the Public Interest Resource Center on the Delaware campus. Students also have the opportunity to participate in extra and co-curricular activities such as Moot court, Moe Levine Trial Advocacy Honor Society, and four law reviews; The Delaware Journal of Corporate Law, The Widener Law Journal, and The Widener Law Review and the Widener Journal of Law, Economics, and Race.

Ranking
In the 2013 edition of the U.S. News & World Report "Best Law School Rankings", Widener was classified as a "Second Tier" law school and the full-time JD program is not given a numerical value, as U.S. News only ranks the Top 145, with the rest being placed in the "Second Tier"; however, for the 2022 rankings, Widener rose to 147th–193rd ranking, and the part-time JD program has been ranked 36th in the nation. In 2010, Widener University School of Law was named to a national list of "Top Green Schools" based on the strength of Widener's environmental law curriculum and the school's earth-friendly practices.  The median LSAT score and the median GPA for the Delaware-campus class entering in 2012 were 150 and 3.09 respectively.  The median LSAT score and the median GPA for the Harrisburg-campus class entering in 2012 were 149 and 3.17 respectively.

Study abroad
Study abroad is offered through the Summer International Law Institute. There are 3 institutes available to students: Kenya, Switzerland and Italy.  While abroad, students sometimes have the ability to intern with international organizations.

Post-graduation

Bar passage
Since 1998, over 3,600 Widener Law graduates have been admitted to the Pennsylvania Bar – more than any other Pennsylvania area law school. The bar exam pass rate for first-time takers of the July 2012 Pennsylvania exam was 80 percent for both Widener Law campuses. The bar exam pass rate for Widener University School of Law Delaware Campus students taking the February 2013 Pennsylvania exam was third highest of all 10 Pennsylvania area law schools.
The July 2013 Pennsylvania bar exam pass rate for Widener University School of Law Delaware Campus and Harrisburg Campus were the lowest (71%) and second lowest (75%) respectively of the 10 Pennsylvania area law schools.

Costs
The total cost of attendance (indicating the cost of tuition, fees, and living expenses) at Widener for the 2013–2014 academic year is $59,933. The Law School Transparency estimated debt-financed cost of attendance for three years is $230,150.

Employment statistics
According to the law professor blog, The Faculty Lounge, based on 2012 ABA data, 38.7% of graduates obtained full-time long term positions requiring bar admission (i.e., jobs as lawyers), 9 months after graduation, ranking 177th out of 197 law schools.

According to Widener's official 2013 ABA-required disclosures, 48% of the Class of 2013 obtained full-time, long-term, JD-required employment nine months after graduation. Widener's Law School Transparency under-employment score is 20.3%, indicating the percentage of the Class of 2013 unemployed, pursuing an additional degree, or working in a non-professional, short-term, or part-time job nine months after graduation.

Student loan debt

According to U.S. News & World Report, the average indebtedness of 2013 graduates who incurred law school debt was $130,180 (not including undergraduate debt), and 91% of 2013 graduates took on debt.

Partnerships

Undergraduate programs
Qualified undergraduate students at Widener University are eligible to apply to the law school under three special admissions programs.
Express Admissions Program – Students in the top half of their class who score in the top 50th percentile on the LSAT are eligible to apply for express admission to the law school.
3+3 Fast Track Program – Government and politics students can earn their undergraduate degree and law degree in just six years.
Legal Studies and Analysis Minor – This minor partners the undergraduate college with the law school to help prepare Widener students for the LSAT.

Stockton University
Beginning in 2009, Widener Law has offered an express admissions option to students and alumni from Stockton University.
Express Admissions Program – Stockton students and graduates are eligible to apply for express admission to either campus.

Notable faculty
Joseph R. Biden Jr., taught at the law school from 1991 through fall 2008, until he assumed the role of Vice President of the United States.

Notable alumni
As of 2010, the school had more than 13,000 alumni practicing around the world.

Dawn Marie Addiego (1987), New Jersey state senator (R)
Peter J. Barnes III (1985), New Jersey assemblyman (D)
Bryan Cutler (2006), Pennsylvania Speaker of the House (R)
Carl Danberg (198-), former Delaware Attorney General (D)
Madeleine Dean (1984), Pennsylvania Congresswoman (D)
Domenick DiCicco (19--), New Jersey assemblyman (R)
Risa Vetri Ferman (1990), Court of Common Pleas in Montgomery County, district attorney
Jon D. Fox (1975), former U.S. Congressman (R-PA)
Tom Gannon (1976), Pennsylvania House of Representatives, 1979 to 2006
Stephanie Hansen (19--), Delaware state senator
Tom Houghton (199-), former Pennsylvania assemblyman
Matthew McGrory (dec'd), actor
Mike Missanelli (1986), Philadelphia sports radio personality
Pat Quinn (1983), Canadian-born former NHL coach and general manager
Curt Schroder (1989), Pennsylvania assemblyman (R)
John C. Sigler (1987), former National Rifle Association president
Lee Solomon (1978), New Jersey Supreme Court justice
Todd Stephens (politician) (2000), Pennsylvania assemblyman (R)
Brian Tierney (1987), former publisher of The Philadelphia Inquirer and Philadelphia Daily News
Gary Traynor (1983), Delaware Supreme Court justice
Terry Van Horne (1993), former Pennsylvania assemblyman (D)

References

External links

Widener University
Law schools in Delaware
Wilmington, Delaware
Private universities and colleges in Delaware
Educational institutions established in 1971
1971 establishments in Delaware
Education in New Castle County, Delaware
Buildings and structures in Wilmington, Delaware